Slovenská sporiteľňa is the largest commercial bank in Slovakia. It provides comprehensive banking services to more than 2 million clients via the largest distribution network with 400 retail outlets. It administers almost 6 million accounts, which proves its stable position in the Slovak banking sector.

In 2001, the bank became part of Erste Group.

History

Slovenská sporiteľňa has the longest tradition out of all the banking institutions in Slovakia, which dates back to the 19th century.

 1819 – first branches of Die Erste oesterreichische Spar-Casse in Pressburg (Bratislava), Trnava, Banská Bystrica and Levoča
 1841/42 – first savings banks in Pressburg – Pressburger Spar-Casse 
 1844 – savings banks in Košice and Trnava 
 1845 – savings banks in Komárno, Prešov and Zvolen 
 1846 – 1848 – savings banks established in majority of the cities, Banská Štiavnica, Kremnica, Lučenec, Nové Zámky, Spišská Nová Ves 
 1953 – part of Štátna banka československá súčasť Štátnej banky československej
 1969 – active as Slovenská štátna sporiteľňa, š.p.ú. (Slovak State Savings Bank)
 1990 – universal banking license 
 1991 – entered the money and capital market
 1994 – transformation to Slovenská sporiteľňa, a.s. (Slovak Savings Bank join-stock company)
 1998 – 2000: transformation process for privatization of the bank 
 2000 – privatization of majority of the shares 87,18 %
 2001 – became a member of financial group - Erste Bank der oesterreichischen Sparkassen AG

Ratings
Fitch Ratings Fitch Ratings

 Long-term rating	A-
 Short-term rating	F1
 Support rating	1
 Viability rating	bbb+
 Outlook stable

Awards
 2005, 2006, 2011, 2012, 2013, 2014, 2015: Euromoney Awards for Excellence – Best Bank in Slovakia
 2011, 2012, 2013, 2014, 2014: The Banker – Bank of the Year
 2012, 2013, 2014, 2015, 2016: TREND – TREND TOP Banka roka

Headquarters
 Slovenská sporiteľňa, a.s., Tomášikova 48, Bratislava, 832 37, Slovakia

References

External links
 Slovenská sporiteľňa official site
 Slovenská sporiteľňa's Fact Sheet
 Erste Group

Banks of Slovakia
Banks established in 1994
1994 establishments in Slovakia
Banks under direct supervision of the European Central Bank